Republicanism in Jamaica is a position which advocates that Jamaica's system of government be changed from a constitutional monarchy to a republic. Both major political partiesthe Jamaica Labour Party and the People's National Partysubscribe to the position, and the current Prime Minister of Jamaica, Andrew Holness, has announced that transitioning to a republic will be a priority of his government. In June 2022, the Jamaican government announced its intention that Jamaica become a republic by the time of the next election in 2025. The process will include a two-thirds majority vote in parliament along with a referendum.

Background
In the lead-up to Jamaican independence in 1962, the Parliament of Jamaica established a cross-party joint select committee to prepare a new constitution. The committee received several submissions calling for Jamaica to become a republic, which it "heard politely, but rejected unceremoniously". The People's Freedom Movement, an extra-parliamentary opposition party, suggested that the constitution include a provision for a referendum on a republic at a later date, but this was not carried out. Both major party leaders in Jamaica in the lead-up to independence (the JLP's Alexander Bustamante and the PNP's Norman Manley) were opposed to Jamaica becoming a republic. Law professor Stephen Vasciannie has suggested that the decision to retain the monarchy at independence was due to several factors, including a desire for continuity and stability, a desire to demonstrate the maturity required for independence, the popularity of the Royal Family amongst Jamaicans, and tendencies towards Anglophilia among the political elites.

History

The first Jamaican prime minister to make steps towards a republic was Michael Manley, whose People's National Party (PNP) came to power at the 1972 general election. His government established a commission into constitutional reform in 1975, and in July 1977, following a march to commemorate the Morant Bay rebellion, Manley announced that Jamaica would become a republic by 1981. However, his government was defeated at the 1980 general election by the more conservative Jamaica Labour Party (JLP), led by Edward Seaga. Seaga was also a republican, having expressed a preference for a "ceremonial presidency" in 1977. Despite this, no concrete moves towards a republic occurred during his premiership.

In 2002, the Parliament of Jamaica, with the PNP, led by PJ Patterson, holding the plurality of seats, abolished the requirement for public servants to take an oath of allegiance to the Jamaican monarch. At a PNP conference in September 2003, Patterson expressed his hopes that Jamaica would become a republic by 2007, stating that "the time has come when we must have a head of state chosen by us". However, his government's attempts to transition to a republic were stifled by its simultaneous attempts to abolish the Judicial Committee of the Privy Council as the final court of appeal in Jamaica and replace it with Caribbean Court of Justice. The opposition JLP were against that decision (which would also have required a constitutional amendment) and made their support for republicanism conditional on a referendum being held for the judicial changes, which was not forthcoming.

The PNP was defeated in the 2007 general election. The new prime minister, JLP leader Bruce Golding, promised that his government would "amend the constitution to replace the Queen with a Jamaican president who symbolises the unity of the nation", but the JLP's term in Cabinet came to an end at the 2011 general election without any formal steps towards a republic having been taken. Portia Simpson-Miller, the PNP leader and new prime minister, also publicly affirmed her commitment to republicanism, stating a preference for an elected president. However, the PNP lost power at the 2016 general election without bringing about constitutional change. Andrew Holness, Simpson-Miller's successor as prime minister, also affirmed a commitment to republicanism upon taking office and stated his Cabinet would introduce a bill to replace the Queen with "a non-executive president as head of state".

During the 2020 Jamaican general election, the PNP promised to hold a referendum on becoming a republic within 18 months if it won the election and a poll showed 55% of respondents desired the country become a republic. However, the ruling JLP, which had in 2016 promised a referendum but not carried one out, was re-elected and stated that holding a referendum remains a goal.

In April 2022, former Prime Minister PJ Patterson resigned from the Privy Council of the United Kingdom in support of a push for a republic. The Minister of Legal and Constitutional Affairs, Marlene Malahoo Forte, announced that the transition is to be completed by the time of next general election, currently scheduled to be in 2025. Popular support for republicanism accelerated following the death of Elizabeth II.

Legal process
All amendments to the Constitution of Jamaica must be approved by an absolute majority in both the House of Representatives and the Senate. However, certain sections of the constitution, including those pertaining to the monarchy, can only be amended if they are approved by a two-thirds majority in both houses and submitted to a referendum.

See also

Republicanism in Australia
Republicanism in Barbados
Republicanism in Canada
Republicanism in New Zealand
Republicanism in the United Kingdom

References

 
Jamaica
Politics of Jamaica